One Outs (stylized as ONE OUTS) is a Japanese baseball-themed manga series written and illustrated by Shinobu Kaitani. It was originally serialized in Shueisha's seinen manga magazine Business Jump from 1998 to 2006, followed by a short-term sequel, One Outs: Miwaku no All-Star-hen, from 2008 to 2009. An anime television series adaptation produced by Madhouse and directed by Yuzo Sato aired on Nippon TV from October 2008 to April 2009.

Plot
The Saitama Lycaons are the weakest team in the Japanese league. Hiromichi Kojima, the Lycaons' star batter, forms a training camp in Okinawa to try for his last attempt at a championship after 21 years. When the minor league pitcher training with Kojima becomes injured, him and Kojima's trainer goes to look for a replacement, but run into trouble by participating in the "One Outs" game, where a pitcher and batter duel 1-on-1 with money on the line. The next day, Kojima arrives to avenge his teammates and meets Tōa Tokuchi, who appears to have no special pitching skills, but defeats Kojima easily and causes him to enter seclusion to re-evaluate himself as a professional player. Later, Tokuchi accepts a rematch after Kojima raised the stakes, proclaiming he will retire immediately if he loses, but he will "take" Tokuchi's right arm to make sure he will never gamble on baseball again if Tokuchi loses. This time, Tokuchi experiences his very first loss and offers Kojima his right arm to have it broken. Instead, Kojima tells him he never intended to break it, and asks Tokuchi to join the Lycaons and use his unique pitching ability to take the Lycaons to the championship. Soon, Tokuchi meets Saikawa, the greedy owner of the Lycaons who only cares about the team making a profit. Saikawa is reluctant to give Tokuchi any sort of significant salary due to his inexperience as a professional, but Tokuchi offers an unusual proposal. He proposes the 'One Outs contract', a performance-based pay where he gets 5,000,000 yen for every out he pitches, but loses  for every run he gives up.

Later on in the baseball season, it is revealed that even the "One Outs contract" was done for the benefit of the team as Saikawa had no plans to keep the Lycaons and set up a deal to sell the team to the Tronpos company. Knowing this, Tokuchi formed an alliance with Tronpos and provided financial intel on Saikawa in exchange for financial backing. With this intel, Tronpos is able to make sure they are able to purchase the Lycaons as cheaply as possible by spreading rumors to dissuade other corporations from bidding. Unfortunately for the Lycaons, Tronpos also has no plans on proceeding with the current lineup and will replace all players after purchasing them. The Tronpos chairman made a mistake by believing Tokuchi to be his supporter and told Tokuchi his intended bid, to which Tokuchi responded with a last minute counter-offer.

For triple the bid, Tokuchi becomes the new owner of the Lycaons. Though there is heavy dissent in the team due to his dubious nature, Tokuchi starts to implement a wide variety of changes, most notably the L-Ticket. It is the old admission ticket with a new 1.5× admission fee, but with the promise of a full refund if the Lycaons loses the game. Additionally, the spectators can make up to five votes for the MVP on the ticket, which will directly influence the new player salaries by paying 200 yen per vote. Though the Lycaons are in chaos with the new changes, the team slowly realizes that these changes are what the team needs in order to become strong enough to win the championship.

Characters

Main
 

A successful gambler and pitcher in the game called "One Outs". After losing a game of One Outs for the first time ever to Kojima, he joins the Lycaons with an odd contract, the One Outs contract, that decides his pay based on his performance.
He uses his perceptive intellect to manipulate professional baseball, and becomes a professional baseball team pitcher. In that role he psychologically manipulates and intimidates the batters he faces along with playing high-stakes psychological and intellectual battles against his own antagonistic team owner, competing team coaches, and underhanded opposing teams.

Kojima is the cleanup batter for the professional baseball team, Saikyou Saitama Lycaons. He is defeated by Toa during his time at the training camp after challenging Toa to avenge his relief pitcher, Nakane. After his defeat, he goes into the forest to train himself mentally against Toa but as he trained he injured his wrist. Even with the injury, he decides to challenges Toa to a rematch with the bet that if he wins, he would take Toa's arm. With the One Outs game ending in a do or die pitch, Kojima resolves that he couldn't lose, getting in the way of the ball and making the pitch count as a deadball. He wins the match because of this, albeit not without contention. Toa admits defeat and Kojima makes Toa join the Lycaons, effectively taking Toa's arm and disabling him from gambling ever again in a One Outs game.

He is the catcher of the Saikyou Saitama Lycaons and is the first to notice Tokuchi's talents as he catches Tokuchi's simple-looking fastball pitches. Apart from Kojima, Ideguchi is the other key member of the Lycaons and stands as the voice of reason in disputes. Due to Ideguchi's trust in Tokuchi, Tokuchi also trusts Ideguchi enough to include him in his plans. Together, they dismantle the opposing team's offense and tricks.

The owner of the Saikyou Saitama Lycaons team. He is more interested in gaining money than getting the Lycaons to win. He forms the One Outs contract with Toa Tokuchi in order to avoid paying a salary to Tokuchi, and to increase the Lycaons sale value by increasing their profitability.

Supporting

The manager of the Saikyou Saitama Lycaons; Obediently obeys every order given to him by the owner until anime episode 15. In episode 15 he is likened to a dog for his unwavering obedience to the owner. Mihara genuinely wishes for the team to succeed and begins to oppose the owner when the Lycaons start to win their games thanks to Tokuchi.

The Fingers' starting pitcher and the Rookie of Year for the year before. He also notices how terrifying Toa is when he pitches, he urges the team to try and take a hit, but the result is still the same and his team loses the match. He is named by Takami of the Mariners to be the strongest pitcher in the league.
Dennis Johnson

A foreigner who was scouted by Coach Shiroka of the Bugaboos during a 100m track and field event. Though he fell behind in the race, he was able to lead up to the 30m mark. Coach Shiroka explained that since the distance between bases was about 27m, Johnson is the baseball world's fastest man. Johnson is also known for his ability to bunt, and sports an intimidating tattoo around his right eye.
The Chiba Mariners
The strongest team in Japan for the last 3 years. This team goes against the Lycaons with 3 consecutive games, with their strongest cleanup crew comprising Takami Itsuki, Thomas and Brooklyn.

One of the cleanup batters in the team "Chiba Mariners", he is known to be a prodigy in baseball and his eyes have the best in motion vision in the baseball world. He is the best hitter in the entire league.

Media

Manga
One Outs, written and illustrated by Shinobu Kaitani, was serialized in Shueisha's seinen manga magazine Business Jump from 1998 to 2006. Shueisha collected its chapters in nineteen tankōbon volumes released from June 18, 1999, to October 19, 2006. A sequel, titled , was serialized from 2008 to 2009, with its chapters collected in a single tankōbon volume, released on February 19, 2009.

Volume list

Anime
An anime television series adaptation by Madhouse was announced in August 2008. Produced by Nippon TV, D.N. Dream Partners, VAP and Madhouse, the series was directed by Yuzo Sato, with Hideo Takayashiki handling series composition, Takahiro Umehara designing the characters and Akihiko Matsumoto composing the music. Kunihiko Sakurai, Haruhito Takada and Masaki Hinata served as additional character designers. The series ran for twenty-five episodes on Nippon TV from October 8, 2008, to April 1, 2009.

Episode list

See also
Gambling in Japan

Notes

References

External links
 One Outs anime website 
 One Outs anime home video website 
 

1998 manga
2008 anime television series debuts
Anime series
Anime series based on manga
Baseball in anime and manga
Anime and manga about gambling
Madhouse (company)
Nippon TV original programming
Psychological anime and manga
Seinen manga
Shueisha franchises
Shueisha manga